Woolley's moss mouse (Pseudohydromys patriciae) is a species of mouse  endemic to Papua New Guinea. It was first described in 2009.

References

External links

 

Pseudohydromys
Mammals described in 2009
Mammals of Papua New Guinea
Endemic fauna of Papua New Guinea
Rodents of New Guinea